Prestige is a lager brewed by Brasserie Nationale d'Haïti (BRANA) in Port-au-Prince, Haiti. It is widely consumed and is the best-selling beer in Haiti with a 98% market share. Prestige beer is available in some parts of the United States and other countries. In 2011, Heineken publicly announced it acquired a controlling interest in BRANA by increasing its ownership from 22.5% to 95%

History
Prestige was founded in 1976 by Michael Madsen; he is a member of one of the richest industrial families in Haiti. His ancestors  arrived from Denmark in the late 19th century. Prestige  was launched less than two years after BRANA's creation. In 2005, Prestige  began to be exported to select Canadian and U.S. cities.

Awards
 2000 World Beer Cup gold medalist, American-Style Lager category
 2012 World Beer Cup gold medalist, American-Style Cream Ale or Lager category

Packaging

In 2018, BRANA introduced its new international standard bottling line and a new blue and red label, which are the colors of the flag of Haiti. Prestige beer is available in a 12 fl. oz. and 16 fl. oz. bottles.

See also
World Beer Cup
Cuauhtémoc Moctezuma Brewery
Brasserie Nationale d'Haïti
Beer in the Caribbean

References

External links

Beer brands
Beer in the Caribbean
Food and drink introduced in 1976
Haitian alcoholic drinks
Haitian brands